Beeckman is a surname of Dutch origin.

Those bearing it include:

 Isaac Beeckman (1588–1637), Dutch philosopher and scientist
 Andries Beeckman (fl. 17th century), Dutch painter
 Robert Livingston Beeckman (1866–1935), American politician, governor of Rhode Island 1915–21
 Théophile Beeckman (1896–1955), Belgian professional road bicycle racer
 Koen Beeckman (born 1973), Belgian bicycle road racer

Dutch-language surnames